Gary W. Rulon is a former chief judge of the Kansas Court of Appeals. He was appointed to this court in 1988 and he was appointed Chief Judge in 2001 and served until 2011.

Biography
Rulon was born in Manhattan, Kansas, and grew up in Topeka. He received his B.A. degree in 1969 and his law degree in 1971 from Washburn University. He served in the U.S. Navy before beginning his legal career.  He is married and has two daughters.

Legal career
From March 1972 until December 1979, Rulon worked as a private practice attorney in Emporia. He then became a staff attorney on the Central Staff of the United States Court of Appeals for the Tenth Circuit until August 1980. He went back to private practice in Emporia for a few months until January 1981, when he became an administrative judge on the 5th Judicial District of Kansas. He held this position until his appointment to the Court of Appeals.

References

Kansas Court of Appeals Judges
Living people
Year of birth missing (living people)